North Walsham is a market town and civil parish in Norfolk, England, within the North Norfolk district.

Demography
For the purposes of local government, the parish falls within the district of North Norfolk.

Transport
The town is served by North Walsham railway station, on the Bittern Line between Norwich, Cromer and Sheringham. The main road through the town is the A149. The town is also located on the B1145, a route that runs between King's Lynn and Mundesley.

The town is on the North Walsham & Dilham Canal (privately owned by the North Walsham Canal Company). The canal ran from Antingham Mill, largely following the course of the River Ant, to a point below Honing. A short branch canal leaves the main navigation near Honing and terminates at the village of Dilham.

History
The towns name means 'W(e)alh's homestead/village'.

 North Walsham, an Anglo-Saxon settlement, and the neighbouring village of Worstead became very prosperous from the 12th century through the arrival of weavers from Flanders. The two settlements gave their names to the textiles they produced: 'Walsham' became the name of a lightweight cloth for summer wear, and 'Worsted' a heavier cloth. The 14th century 'wool churches' are a testament to the prosperity of the local mill owners. North Walsham's church of St. Nicholas was originally dedicated to the Blessed Virgin Mary and is one of the UK's largest parish churches. It was also the site of a wayside shrine to St. Thomas of Canterbury. This church had the second-tallest steeple in Norfolk until its collapse in 1724. Plans for its rebuilding were abandoned at the outbreak of the Second World War. The ruined tower dominates the town centre and is a famous landmark of the area, visible from many miles away. In the parish church of St. Nicholas can be found the ornate tomb of Sir William Paston; the remains of medieval painted screens; a telescopic Gothic font canopy; a unique Royal Arms Board; an ancient iron-bound chest; and many other ancient artefacts.

North Walsham was involved in the Peasants' Revolt of 1381. The peasants' leaders were defeated at the Battle of North Walsham and the site is marked by a wayside stone near the town's water towers.

The Great Fire of North Walsham took place on 25 June 1600. It began at six o'clock in the morning from a house occupied by a person with the surname of Dowle. Dowle subsequently fled and was captured and placed in gaol. The fire was devastating and destroyed 118 homes, 70 shops, the market cross, and market stalls. Although the church caught fire in five places, the building was mostly undamaged. It provided shelter for people whilst the town was being rebuilt.

The English naval hero, Horatio Nelson, and his brother, William, were educated at Paston Grammar School in North Walsham, founded by Sir William Paston (of Paston Letters fame) in 1606. Nelson left the school to start his naval career at the age of eleven. The school became Paston College in 1984.

During World War II, a North Walsham man lost his life when his Royal Air Force training aeroplane crashed in the United States. Local residents living near the site, in the State of Oklahoma, erected a monument in 2000 honouring the lives of all four RAF fliers who perished. The residents, who include Choctaw Native American People, and the Choctaw Nation government, continue honouring the lives of all four on each anniversary of the crashes, which took place in February 1943.

As part of the millennium celebrations, ten mosaics were commissioned, showing scenes from local history, including the Peasants' Revolt and the Great Fire of North Walsham, and a picture of a Norfolk wherry – an allusion to the canal.

Cinemas
North Walsham Picturedrome opened in King Arms Street around 1912 and survived until around September 1931. In 1931 the Regal Cinema opened in New Road and was open until 1979. When the Regal closed, the building was turned into a Vauxhall car dealership and later a Plant hire business, but in 2018 was knocked down to make room for housing.

32-years later, North Walsham had a cinema again, the Atrium, which opened in 2011. The Atrium is a state-of-the-art theatre and cinema with regular screenings and special events around the films.

Oak Tree Sculpture 
The town's park features an oak tree sculpture commemorating the Battle of the Peasants' Revolt at North Walsham in 1381, and the Agricultural Workers Union being founded in the town in 1906. It is constructed from a 120-year-old tree that was diseased and was due to be felled. The sculpture was unveiled in September 1999.

North Walsham High School & the Atrium
North Walsham High School is an academy school for pupils aged 11 to 16 located in the town. The school is administered by Enrich Learning Trust. The school converted from community school status in October 2019. The school includes a £5.3m arts and education development called the 'Atrium', which is open to the wider community, funded by the initial co-location funds of reanimating communities. The building belongs to North Walsham High School, but the theatre, cinema, workshop, and events programme is run by a registered charity (The Atrium North Norfolk Ltd). The charity was formed in early 2013 and operates as 'the Atrium'.

Sport
North Walsham is home to a London 1 North rugby team. North Walsham R.F.C. narrowly missed out on promotion to National League 2 in 2005–06, losing a play-off to Nuneaton. It is also home to the North Norfolk Vikings Swimming Club who train at the Victory Leisure Centre on Station Road. You will find North Walsham parkrun every Saturday morning which is a free, timed 5k event at 9am at North Walsham High School. England footballer Lauren Hemp was born in the town and played for the local team as a child.

Museum and heritage
North Walsham is home to the Norfolk Motorcycle Museum, a privately owned collection of around 80 motorcycles dating up to 1960. Toys are also on display, particularly die-cast toys.

North Walsham is home to the North Walsham Heritage Centre. The Heritage Centre displays information and artefacts on the whole range of the town's history.

Freedom of the Town
The following people and military units have received the Freedom of the Town of North Walsham.

Individuals
 Lauren Hemp: 5 August 2022.

References

External links

 North Walsham Town Council
 North Walsham Archive
 North Walsham Fun Day
 North Walsham History
 North Walsham In Bloom
 North Walsham Community Centre
 North Walsham Live Aid
 North Walsham Funday and Carnival
 North Walsham Scouts
 St Nicholas' Church, North Walsham
 North Walsham Chamber for Business
 North Norfolk Vikings Swimming Club
 North Walsham parkrun

 
Market towns in Norfolk
Towns in Norfolk
Civil parishes in Norfolk
North Norfolk